Góis is a Portuguese freguesia ("civil parish") in the municipality of Góis. The population in 2011 was 2,171, in an area of 72.87 km².

References

External links
Official website 

Freguesias of Góis